Splendour is a play by Welsh playwright and screenwriter Abi Morgan. It was first performed at the Edinburgh festival at the Traverse Theatre in 2000 in a production by Paines Plough.

The play runs for approximately 95 minutes with no intermission.

Production history

References

2000 plays
Welsh plays